Massachusett Pidgin English was an English-based contact language that had developed in early seventeenth century New England and Long Island as a medium of communication between the Native speakers of Algonquian languages and the English settlers that began to settle the coastal areas in 1620s.   The use of Massachusett Pidgin English co-existed in Massachusett-speaking communities with their original dialects as well as Massachusett Pidgin, another contact language that was Massachusett-based.  Unlike Massachusett Pidgin, which was confused with the Massachusett language by the English colonists, attestations of Massachusett Pidgin English are quite numerous.  As few of the colonists were able to or willing to master either Massachusett or its Pidgin variety, those that traded and lived directly next to Indian villages communicated in Massachusett Pidgin English.  The use of Massachusett Pidgin English supplanted the use of Massachusett Pidgin and likely even overtook the native language in community.  In a process likely to decreolization, the speakers of Massachusett Pidgin English began to adjust their language to the English of their neighbors, and since the nineteenth century, all the descendants of the Massachusett-speaking peoples have been monolingual English speakers.  

Massachusett Pidgin English and Massachusett Pidgin are of special interest to scholars of the English language as it seems that these two languages were the vectors of transmission of Algonquian loan words into the English language.  The English settlers of New England called the specialized Indian vocabulary ',' after , the Massachusett Pidgin and Massachusett Pidgin English term for 'house' or 'home' instead of the Massachusett term .  Unfortunately, as the English settlers and their descendants pushed westward, they retained elements of Massachusett Pidgin English, especially vocabulary, in dealings with other tribes, and many of the words used innocently by the Pilgrims and Puritans of New England, such as ',' ',' '' and ',' are viewed by most Native peoples today as pejorative, racist insults due to their use by the English settlers and pioneers, and use of these terms by White teachers in Native American public schools is believed to be one reason for the high dropout rates of Native students in U.S. schools.

History

English contacts prior to 1620
The Pilgrim settlers were shocked to be greeted in English by Samoset with a 'Hello, Englishmen!'  A visiting sachem from Monhegan Island, Samoset would later introduce Pilgrim settlers to Squanto who was even more fluent in English.  Squanto would later aid the Pilgrims as an important middleman in relations with the Wampanoag tribes around them, such as that of Massasoit, but also taught them how to survive by teaching them local agricultural practices.  Only a handful of visits by the settlers are recorded.  Bartholomew Gosnold established a short-lived trading post on Cuttyhunk Island in 1602.  John Smith mapped the region in 1612, and stopped in several Massachusett and Wampanoag villages to trade for supplies and meet the local leaders.  In 1607, the Popham Colony was established, but abandoned after a year due to infighting between political factions.  

Encounters were definitely more frequent than previously thought. English fishermen began setting up camps onshore in Newfoundland in 1520, and may have ventured further south to partake of the rich bounty of cod.  Samoset's encounters with English fishermen on his home island were frequent enough that he was able to recount the names of several captains and their crewmen. Both Squanto and the Nauset sachem Epenow were abducted from the coast by European merchant ships and sold into slavery in Spain. However, both Squanto and Epenow managed to escape by finding work as interpreters on vessels trading along the coast until they found their way home and could reunite with their kinsmen or join other tribes. The Native American presence in Europe was so prevalent that William Shakespeare references it in The Tempest, where he writes, 'Any strange beast makes a man [prosperous], they will not give a doit to relieve a lame beggar, [but] they will give ten [pence] to see a dead Indian.' Local Native Americans explained the practise to the Pilgrims, when several locals, including an aged woman, recounted their sufferings to the Pilgrims with Samoset and Squanto translating. Details of these recollections were later written down by the Pilgrims themselves.

Features

Massachusett Pidgin loan words
The majority of terms were taken from the English language.  However, numerous terms were taken from the local Algonquian languages, usually via Massachusett Pidgin, to describe Indian culture, technology and material culture and local plant and animal terms.  Most of these words come from Massachusett, although some words were either archaic retentions or cognate borrowings from Narragansett or the Abenakian languages, all of which were closely related.  In many ways, Massachusett Pidgin English seems to be Massachusett Pidgin relexified with English words.

 , 'friend,' from Massachusett  , 'my friend.'
 wigwam, 'house' or 'home.' Possibly Abenakian, cf. Western Abenaki  . Pidgin form probably pronounced as *() . Possibly an archaic retention, both wigwam and wetu derive from Proto-Algonquian *  Although wetu was also known, wigwam won as the general word and one that still has currency.
 sagamore, 'chief' or 'leader.' Possibly Abenakian, cf. Western Abenaki  . Both sagamore and sachem derive from Proto-Algonquian *
 wunnekin, 'good,' from Massachusett  , 'it is good.'
 pappoose, 'baby.' Possibly from Narragansett . Compare Mohegan-Pequot  .
 nux, 'yes,' from Massachusett  , 'yes.'

Calques
Several expressions in Massachusett Pidgin English were calques of expressions and words from Massachusett or Massachusett Pigdin English.  Calques are words that are semantic translations of expressions from other languages, or words that are borrowed but influenced by the variant usages in the other language.
 big to mean 'big,' 'large,' 'grand' and 'sacred,' same as the meanings of Massachusett  .
 firewater, although attested later, likely influenced by Massachusett and several Algonquian languages of the expression 'water that causes suffering' or 'sickening water,' such as Massachusett  .
The colonists mistakenly thought the strung beads of wampum were currency. Shortened to wampum *() and peag *() in usage by the English.
 bury the hatchet, 'to make peace' or 'to withdraw a grudge,' attested in the eighteenth century, but referenced as a custom in colonial New England, where leaders of tribes would literally bury their weapons as a symbol of peace after agreements.
 all one this, from Massachusett Pidgin tatapa you, 'the same as this,' from Massachusett  , 'it is similar (to something) this (thing)' or 'the same as this.' Cf. Massachusett  , 'it is alike.'

Massachusett phonology
As Massachusett Pidgin English was often spoken by peoples who spoke Massachusett or closely related languages, the influences of their native languages in pronunciation must have been substantial.  It is believed that most Indians pronounced English words either as close to English as possible, such as those that interacted frequently with English speakers or for the many women and children that worked as indentured servants in the households of English settlers.  Others likely substituted the closest approximate Algonquian phonology to approximate the sounds.  Massachusett  lacked /b/, /d/, /f/, /g/, /dʒ/, /ʒ/, /θ/, /ð/ and /ŋ/ and the distinction between voiced and unvoiced consonants and permitted far fewer consonant clusters than English.

Evidence of this pronunciation interference includes different spellings of English loan words in the Massachusett documents, such as the English word 'Frenchmen' which was rendered as borrowed , possibly  with English-influenced pronunciation by proficient speakers, or also attested  possibly  indicating influence of Massachusett phonology. Similarly, English speakers from the Commonwealth countries pronounce 'penchant' as the French do, as opposed to the nativized pronunciation preferred in the U.S., .

Although this is not always shown in the documents recording Massachusett Pidgin English written by the colonists, spelling in Massachusett documents by the Indians show that words with 'r' and 'l' were replaced by 'n' due to influence of language development. Proto-Eastern Algonquian reflexes of *r were unstable in the development of Massachusett.

References

Native American history of Massachusetts
English-based pidgins and creoles
Languages attested from the 17th century
Languages extinct in the 18th century
English language in the United States
Massachusett language